Harold Haugh (born November 23, 1949) is a Democratic politician who previously served in the Michigan House of Representatives, originally elected in 2008. Prior to that, Haugh served as the mayor of Roseville, Michigan.

References

Living people
1949 births
Democratic Party members of the Michigan House of Representatives
Mayors of places in Michigan
Politicians from Detroit
People from Roseville, Michigan
21st-century American politicians